The Dream or Dream is a 1966 Yugoslavian war film directed by Mladomir Puriša Đorđević. It was entered into the 17th Berlin International Film Festival.

Cast
 Ljubiša Samardžić as Mali
 Mihajlo Janketić as Decak 
 Olivera Katarina as Devojka (as Olivera Vuco)
 Mija Aleksić as Ciganin
 Ljuba Tadić as Mile Grk
 Sinisa Ivetić as Heinrich
 Aleksandar Stojković as Berberin
 Bata Živojinović as Lazar
 Stole Arandjelović
 Faruk Begolli as Petar
 Viktor Starčić as Dirigent
 Karlo Bulić as Profesor
 Zoran Bečić

References

External links
 

1966 films
1966 war films
Serbo-Croatian-language films
Yugoslav war films
Serbian war films
Serbian black-and-white films
Yugoslav black-and-white films
Films directed by Mladomir Puriša Đorđević
Avala Film films
Films shot in Serbia
War films set in Partisan Yugoslavia
Yugoslav World War II films
Serbian World War II films